Mick Mercer (born Bichael Bercer, 2 June 1957) is a journalist and author best known for his books, photos and reviews of the goth, punk and indie music scenes.

Life and work
Mercer is primarily a writer focused on the gothic scene and its music. He has also photographed bands from the punk era onwards. He published a monthly online magazine, The Mick, for over ten years and now hosts a weekly live internet radio show, Mick Mercer Radio.

Mercer ran one of the first punk fanzines, Panache, from 1976 to 1992. In 1978, he began writing for British music paper Record Mirror, then freelanced for ZigZag magazine, later becoming its editor until the magazine folded in 1986. During the 1980s, he wrote regularly for the British music weekly Melody Maker, and edited Siren magazine in the 1990s. He has written five books on gothic music, and self-published over 100 books, available through his website. He occasionally publishes reviews of records, visible on his Facebook pages.

Mercer's Music to Die For compendium (2009) was described by The Quietus as having "a far greater stylistic variety than the casual observer might imagine", and as being "stuffed full of the best and most artistic music the world has to offer".
Mercer married in 2016, and appeared to have retired from the fanzine profession, but Panache will now be returning in free pdf format via his website and also as a self-published print entity.

Bibliography
 Mercer, Mick (1988). Gothic Rock Black Book. Omnibus Press. 
 Mercer, Mick (1991). Gothic Rock: All You Ever Wanted to Know...but Were Too Gormless to Ask. Pegasus Publishing. 
 Mercer, Mick (1997). Hex Files: The Goth Bible. Overlook Press; 1 Amer ed edition. 
 Mercer, Mick (2002). 21st Century Goth. Reynolds & Hearn. 
 Mercer, Mick (2009). Music to Die For. Cherry Red Books.

Discography

The second and third books spawned a series of CD compilations, with detailed sleeve notes provided by Mercer.

 Gothic Rock, (double CD)
 Gothic Rock 2, September 1995 (double CD)
 Gothic Rock 3: Black on Black, (double CD)
 Hex Files—The Goth Bible Vol. 1, 1997 (double CD)
 Hex Files—The Goth Bible Vol. 2, (double CD)
 Hex Files—The Goth Bible Vol. 3, 1998 (double CD)

Notes

External links
Official website
- Official books on Kindle
- Official photobooks for sale
Official Mick Mercer prints for sale
Official Mick Mercer Radio news
Interview on Morbidoutlook.com

1958 births
Living people
British music journalists
British writers